Zaibunnisa Street, is a thoroughfare in central Karachi, Pakistan that courses through Saddar, the city's colonial-era commercial centre. It is believed to have been renamed after Zaib-un-Nissa Hamidullah, Pakistan's first woman editor and publisher, in 1970. However, some historians argue it was renamed after the Mughal princess Zeb-un-Nissa.

History
The road was founded as Elphinstone Street and was named after Mountstuart Elphinstone, the first British ambassador to Afghanistan who also played a vital role in defeating the Maratha Empire. It used to be one of the most prestigious shopping areas in Karachi before the newly built shopping malls in the suburban areas of Karachi were built from the 1980s onwards. Zaibunnisa Street now is known for having a huge number of watch, clock and jewelry shops, large clothing stores for women and men, as well as shoe stores.

Route 
Zaibunnisa Street begins at Garden Square - the point at which it intersects with Muhammad Ali Jinnah Road. From there, it courses south, first intersecting with Castle Street near the Brooks Memorial Church. From there, it passes Price Street near Jehangir Park and intersects with Preedy Street. It then enters the central part of Saddar, where it is lined with several heritage buildings. Going south, it intersects with Hale Street in Bohra Bazaar, Albert Street, Woodburn Street, Parr Street, Shahrah-e-Iraq, Dundass Street, Blenken Street, before ending at Sarwar Shaheed Street. From there, it continues south as Fatima Jinnah Street towards Civil Lines.

Gallery

See also
 Zaib-un-Nissa Hamidullah
 List of streets in Karachi

References

Streets in Karachi
Retail markets in Karachi 
Saddar Town